Erma River near Tran is a painting by the artist Nikola Petrov (1881–1916) from around 1910.

Analysis
It represents a landscape of the river gorge near the town of Tran with a flock of geese are depicted in the foreground on the nearer shore, and trees in the background across the river.

Description
The painting's dimensions are 68 x 96 centimeters. The painting was purchased in 1913 by the National Museum in Sofia. It then became part of the permanent collection of the National Art Gallery (Bulgaria).

References 

National Art Gallery, Bulgaria
1910 paintings
Bulgarian art
Landscape paintings